The 21st Washington D.C. Area Film Critics Association Awards were announced on December 12, 2022.

The nominations were announced on December 10, 2022. Everything Everywhere All at Once and The Fabelmans led the nominations with eleven each, followed by The Banshees of Inisherin with eight.

Winners and nominees

Multiple nominations and wins

The following films received multiple nominations:

The following films received multiple awards:

References

External links
 The Washington D.C. Area Film Critics Association

2022 film awards
2022